The GNU Binary Utilities, or , are a set of programming tools for creating and managing binary programs, object files, libraries, profile data, and assembly source code.

Tools
They were originally written by programmers at Cygnus Solutions.

The GNU Binutils are typically used in conjunction with compilers such as the GNU Compiler Collection, build tools like , and the GNU Debugger.

Commands
The  include the following commands:

elfutils
Ulrich Drepper wrote , to partially replace GNU Binutils, purely for Linux and with support only for ELF and DWARF. It distributes three libraries with it for programmatic access.

See also

 GNU Core Utilities
 GNU Debugger
ldd (Unix), list symbols imported by the object file; similar to 
 List of Unix commands
llvm provides similar set of tools
 strace, a tool for system call debugging (enabled by kernel functionality) available on many distributions

References

External links
 
 The ELF Tool Chain Project : the BSD license similar project (mirror)

Programming tools
Free compilers and interpreters
GNU Project software